Club Italia may refer to
 Club Italia (women's volleyball)
 Club Italia (men's volleyball)